The Firm is a 1991 legal thriller by American writer John Grisham. It was his second book and the first which gained wide popularity. In 1993, after selling 1.5 million copies, it was made into a namesake film starring Tom Cruise, Gene Hackman and Jeanne Tripplehorn. Grisham's first novel, A Time to Kill, came into prominence afterwards due to this novel's success.

Plot
Mitch McDeere is a graduate of Western Kentucky University with a degree in accounting, who has passed his Certified Public Accountant exam on the first attempt and graduated third in his class at Harvard Law School. Mitch is married to his high-school sweetheart, Abby McDeere, an elementary school teacher who also attended Western Kentucky University. His older brother Ray is imprisoned in Tennessee for manslaughter, and his other brother, Rusty, died in Vietnam. His mother suffers from mental health issues and lives in Florida.

Mitch spurns offers from law firms in New York and Chicago in favor of signing with Bendini, Lambert and Locke, a small tax law firm based in Memphis. He finds the firm's offer — a large salary, a lease on a new BMW, and a low-interest mortgage on a house — too generous to resist. Soon after he joins, his new colleagues help him study and pass his bar exam, the first priority for new associates. Mitch is assigned to partner Avery Tolar, the firm's "bad boy," but a highly accomplished attorney.

Two of Mitch's colleagues, Marty Kozinski and Joe Hodge, die in a scuba diving accident in the Cayman Islands a few days before he starts at the firm. On his first scheduled day of work, Mitch attends their funerals. Mitch finds the deaths unsettling, but focuses on his goal of becoming the youngest partner in the firm's history. During a memorial service at the firm for the two deceased attorneys, Mitch notices plaques commemorating three other attorneys who died while working at the firm. Suspicious, he hires a private investigator, Eddie Lomax, an ex-cellmate of his brother Ray, to investigate the deaths.

Lomax discovers that the other three deceased attorneys died under suspicious circumstances: in a car accident, a hunting accident, and a suicide. While the details of their deaths don't add up, nothing concrete was ever proven. Lomax cautions Mitch to be careful. Soon after delivering his report to Mitch, Lomax is murdered. FBI agent Wayne Tarrance confronts Mitch, telling him the FBI is watching the firm.

While in Washington, D.C. on business, the FBI approaches Mitch again. The FBI reveals that the firm is a white collar front for the Morolto crime family of Chicago. The firm's founder, Anthony Bendini, was the son-in-law of old man Morolto. He founded the firm in 1944, and for almost half a century, the firm has lured young lawyers from humble backgrounds with the promise of prestige and financial security. Although Mitch's work so far has been legitimate, the partners and senior associates are deeply immersed in a massive tax fraud and money laundering operation that accounts for as much as 75 percent of the firm's business. By the time members of the firm become aware of its true nature, they cannot leave. No lawyer has escaped the firm alive; the five who tried were killed to keep them from talking. Kozinski and Hodge were actually in contact with the FBI at the time of their murders.

Mitch learns that his house, office, and car are bugged. The FBI tells Mitch that in order to get enough evidence to bring down the firm, he must reveal information about his clients. The attorney-client privilege in most U.S. states, including Tennessee, does not apply to situations when a lawyer knows that a crime is taking place. However, if Mitch cooperates, he will have to reveal information about some of his legitimate clients as well, which will all but end his legal career. The FBI warns Mitch that he will almost certainly go to prison if he chooses to ignore them. The firm also ramps up the pressure on Mitch; the firm's security chief, DeVasher, suspects he is getting too close to the FBI. Desperate to find a way out and stay alive in the process, Mitch has to make a decision quickly.

Ultimately, Mitch and Abby decide to cooperate with the FBI. However, they secretly decide to flee after turning over enough evidence to topple the firm, since they do not completely trust the FBI to protect them. He promises to collect enough evidence to bring down the firm in return for $2 million and Ray's release from prison. Working with Lomax's secretary and lover, Tammy Hemphill, Mitch obtains several confidential documents from the firm's bank records in the Cayman Islands, eventually copying over 10,000 documents detailing over 20 years of illegal transactions.

Mitch tells Tarrance that while these documents spell out only a fraction of the firm's criminal activities, they contain enough evidence to indict roughly half the firm's active members and several retired partners. However, the documents will also provide strong circumstantial evidence that the firm is part and parcel of a criminal conspiracy. This will give the FBI probable cause to obtain a search warrant for the firm's building and with it, access to all of the firm's dirty files. Mitch is certain those files will provide enough evidence for a massive RICO indictment that will bring down the firm and cripple the Morolto family.

Meanwhile, the firm becomes suspicious of Mitch. Tarry Ross, alias "Alfred," a top FBI official and close confidant of Voyles who is actually a mole for another crime family, confirms that Mitch is indeed working with the FBI. Once Mitch learns of the leak, he flees to Panama City Beach, Florida with his brother and wife with the Moroltos and FBI chasing them. On the way, he steals $10 million from one of the firm's Grand Cayman bank accounts, sending some of the money to his mother and in-laws, depositing some in a Swiss bank account, and leaving the rest for Tammy.

Mitch, Abby and Ray manage to escape to the Cayman Islands with the help of Barry Abanks, a scuba diving business owner from the islands whose son died in the incident which killed Kozinski and Hodge. Armed with Mitch's evidence, the FBI indicts 51 present and former members of the Bendini firm, as well as 31 alleged members of the Morolto family, for everything from money laundering to mail fraud. As the book ends, Mitch, Abby and Ray enjoy their newfound wealth in the Cayman Islands.

Origins 
Grisham himself had planned to become a tax lawyer before pivoting to trial law.

He told NBC in 2011:My first book was published in 1989, A Time to Kill. When it came out, it didn't sell. I was very busy then as a lawyer and I told myself, “I’m going to write one more book.” When I was in law school I had a friend he was a top student and this guy was heavily recruited and would go off to visit law firms, and he came back from a trip and he said, “You know, I didn't really feel good about that firm. I got the impression that once you joined the firm you never leave, like it's owned by the Mafia or something.” Well that was ten years earlier but the idea stuck.Grisham began writing The Firm the day after he finished A Time to Kill.

When he sent the draft to his agent, bootleg copies were made and the story was shopped around Hollywood without Grisham’s knowledge and purchased by Paramount Pictures for $600,000. The existence of a movie deal drove demand for the book deal and the book was purchased by Doubleday.

Reception
The book spent 47 weeks on The New York Times Best Seller list and was the No. 1 novel of 1991.

Marilyn Stasio of The New York Times wrote that "Mr. Grisham, a criminal defense attorney, writes with such relish about the firm's devious legal practices that his novel might be taken as a how-to manual for ambitious tax-law students."

The success of the novel and the 1993 film led to a 2012 television show set ten years after the events of the original story and ended up running for one season.

Differences with movie adaptation

The film based on Grisham's book kept the earlier part of the plot, but has a completely different ending. In the film, Mitch makes a deal with the FBI for his brother's release along with large sums of money in exchange for information about his firm's clients. But rather than betray his oath as a lawyer by turning the confidential files over to the FBI, Mitch finds a devious legal way to keep both the FBI and the Mafia off his back so he can continue to practice as a lawyer though not in Tennessee. Reviewer George Crown noted that "In this case, I have the distinct feeling that the film improved on the book. The book's Mitch undergoes a very sudden transformation  - plodding lawyer to dashing action hero. Virtually nothing in what had gone before has given us any idea that he had that in him. The film's Mitch, conversely, stays very much in character. He was a clever young lawyer to start with, that was why The Firm took him on in the first place - but he just gives them a bit more than they bargained for. His way of getting out of the predicament is the quintessential lawyer's way: a very neat, devious (and a bit dubious) legal solution, which only somebody with a good legal mind could have come up with."

References

External links
Publisher excerpt

1991 American novels
American novels adapted into films
Legal thriller novels
Novels by John Grisham
Tennessee culture